Josep Antoni Gómes Moreira (born 3 December 1985) is an Andorran international footballer who plays as a goalkeeper for FC Santa Coloma.

Career
Born in La Massana, Gómes spent most of his club career playing in the Spanish league system, representing FC Andorra, UD Ibiza-Eivissa, CD Ciudad de Vícar and CF San Rafael.

He made his international debut for Andorra in 2006, and has represented them in FIFA World Cup qualifying matches.

On 25 March 2019, during a UEFA Euro qualifying match against Albania, Gómes made what one sports website described as a "howler" that gifted Albania the opening goal when he tried an aerobatic flying kick to clear the ball but failed to do so. His team would go on to lose 3–0.

References

External links
 

1985 births
Living people
People from La Massana
Andorran people of Portuguese descent
Andorran footballers
Andorra international footballers
Andorran expatriate footballers
Expatriate footballers in Spain
Expatriate footballers in France
Association football goalkeepers